Rabideau may refer to:

Rabideau CCC Camp, a Civilian Conservation Corps (CCC) camp in Minnesota, United States
Shawn Rabideau (born 1975), American lifestyle and event planner